Khalid "Billy" Ibadulla  (born 20 December 1935) is a Pakistani New Zealander cricket coach, commentator, former cricket umpire and cricketer. He has worked as TVNZ cricket commentator. He played in four Tests for Pakistan between 1964 and 1967.

First-class career
After a few matches in Pakistan, where he made his first-class debut at the age of 16, Ibadulla played most of his cricket as a professional for Warwickshire, for whom he appeared between 1954 and 1972, mostly as an opening batsman. He made 1000 runs in a season six times, with a highest tally of 2098 runs in 1962. His top score was 171, against Oxford University in 1961.

On a flat Oval pitch in 1960 he scored an unbeaten 170 for Warwickshire against Surrey, and put on 377 with Norman Horner for the first wicket on the first day, then the highest unbroken opening partnership in cricket history.

He was also a useful and economical medium-pace bowler, with a best analysis of 7 for 22 against Derbyshire in 1967.

He played for Otago from 1964–65 to 1966–67, and moved to New Zealand in 1976, living in Dunedin and working as a cricket coach.

Test career
Although he had not played domestic first-class cricket in Pakistan for more than 10 years, Ibadulla was selected to play in the single Test against the visiting Australians in Karachi in 1964–65. Opening the batting, he batted throughout the first day's play, dismissed on stumps for 166 in five and a half hours. The opening partnership of 249 with Abdul Kadir (95) is the highest in Test cricket for any wicket to involve two test debutants.

He declined an invitation to go on the subsequent tour of Australia and New Zealand, as the Pakistan authorities were unable to offer him the professional rates he was accustomed to, and he spent the time playing for Otago and coaching. He made 43 and 102 not out and took four wickets for Otago when they played the Pakistanis, and was later called up by Pakistan for the Third Test, making 28 and 9.

He was also called into the Pakistan side for two Tests during the tour to England in 1967 after dismissing the captain, Hanif Mohammad for a duck while playing for Warwickshire against the touring Pakistanis. However, he made only 47 runs in four innings and took one wicket in the first two Tests, and was not selected in the Test team again.

He holds the record of playing most number of first class games (217) before making a Test debut for Pakistan.

Later career
He has coached some of New Zealand's top cricketers, including Glenn Turner, Ken Rutherford and Chris Cairns. He also taught briefly at St Dunstan's College in London, as a Physical Education teacher in the early 1970s.

He umpired first-class cricket in England in 1982 and 1983.

In the 2004 Queen's Birthday Honours, Ibadulla was appointed a Member of the New Zealand Order of Merit, for services to cricket.

Ibadulla was the subject of a long-running error in the Wisden records section. He was out handled the ball at Courtaulds, Coventry in 1963 when playing for Warwickshire against Hampshire and not obstructing the field as reported in the 1964 Wisden's report of the game and then repeated in the records section from 1967 until 2010.

Personal life
Ibadulla, a Christian, met his German-born wife, Gertrud Delfs, in Birmingham and they married there in 1959. They have two daughters and a son, Kassem.

In the 1993 general election, he stood in the Dunedin West for New Zealand First and came fourth out of six candidates.

References

External links 
 

1935 births
Living people
New Zealand cricketers
New Zealand cricket coaches
New Zealand cricket umpires
New Zealand cricket commentators
New Zealand people of Punjabi descent
Otago cricketers
Tasmania cricketers
Warwickshire cricketers
Commonwealth XI cricketers
International Cavaliers cricketers
Cricketers from Dunedin
Pakistani emigrants to New Zealand
Pakistani cricketers
Pakistan Test cricketers
Pakistani cricket coaches
Pakistani cricket umpires
Pakistani cricket commentators
Cricketers who made a century on Test debut
Punjab (Pakistan) cricketers
Cricketers from Lahore
Pakistani expatriates in Australia
Pakistani expatriates in England
Pakistani Christians
New Zealand Christians
Members of the New Zealand Order of Merit
Unsuccessful candidates in the 1993 New Zealand general election